Warwick Draper (born 23 September 1976 in Melbourne) is an Australian slalom canoeist who has competed since the mid-1990s. Competing in three Summer Olympics, he earned his best finish of fifth in the K1 event in Beijing in 2008.

Draper's love of canoeing began whilst at Eltham college during a school camp when he paddled in a lake.

In 2017 he was a contestant on the inaugural season of Australian Ninja Warrior.

World Cup individual podiums

1 Continental Cup Oceania counting for World Cup points
2 Oceania Championship counting for World Cup points

References

1976 births
Australian male canoeists
Canoeists at the 2004 Summer Olympics
Canoeists at the 2008 Summer Olympics
Canoeists at the 2012 Summer Olympics
Living people
Olympic canoeists of Australia
Sportspeople from Melbourne
Australian Institute of Sport canoeists
21st-century Australian people